Solidão, uma linda história de amor is a Brazilian movie from 1989, directed by Victor Di Mello, with production executive, Carlo Mossy, and script by Victor Di Mello and Avelino Dias dos Santos.

Cast
José Wilker 
Roberto Bonfim 
Stênio Garcia 
Tarcísio Meira 
David Cardoso 
Maitê Proença 
Simone Carvalho 
Magda Cotrofe 
Luma de Oliveira 
Ibanez Filho 
Vera Gimenez 
Paulo Goulart 
Lutero Luiz 
Nuno Leal Maia 
Carlo Mossy 
Pelé 
Rogério Samora 
Cléa Simões 
Luciana Vendramini 
Humberto Catalano
Marcella Prado

See also
Brazilian films of the 1980s

1989 films
Brazilian drama films
1980s Portuguese-language films